Bruce Brett Weber (born October 19, 1956) is the former men's basketball head coach at Kansas State University. Prior to his tenure at Kansas State, Weber was the head coach at Southern Illinois University and the University of Illinois.

Weber won conference championships and conference coach of the year awards at each of the three schools where he served as head coach.  He guided his teams to a combined total of 13 NCAA tournaments in 24 seasons, including an appearance with Illinois in the championship game of the 2005 NCAA tournament. Weber was the consensus national coach of the year in 2005.

Coaching

Early career
Weber began his coaching career with a brief stint as a graduate assistant coach at Western Kentucky University during the 1979–80 season under head coach Gene Keady. In 1980, Weber moved to Purdue University along with Keady. He remained an assistant coach at Purdue for 18 seasons before becoming the head coach at Southern Illinois University in 1998.

Southern Illinois 
In his five seasons at Southern Illinois, Weber led the Salukis to consecutive Missouri Valley Conference championships and NCAA tournament appearances in 2002 and 2003, including a Sweet Sixteen finish in 2002.

University of Illinois
On April 30, 2003, Weber was hired by Illinois to replace Bill Self, who had departed from Illinois to take the head coaching job at Kansas.

2003–04 season

The Illini played a tough early season game against North Carolina on December 2 in Greensboro, and were tied at 69 with just six minutes to go. Illinois eventually lost the game 88–81, but it proved to be a good test for the young team with no seniors in the starting lineup. Weber faced his toughest test after starting the conference schedule with an even 3–3 mark. He changed many doubters' minds by winning the remaining ten games on the conference schedule, winning the Big Ten title outright for the first time since 1952. The Illini finished second losing to Wisconsin in the Big Ten tournament championship game. They received a bid as a #5 seed in the 2004 NCAA tournament, defeating Murray State and Cincinnati in the first two rounds to reach the Sweet Sixteen. A 72–62 loss to top-seeded Duke ended their tournament run, but capped a solid first season for coach Weber.

2004–05 season

The 2005 season opened with high expectations and the return of all the team's starters. On December, 1 the Illini defeated the number-one ranked team, Wake Forest, 91–73, at Assembly Hall. Weber sported a glowing orange blazer for the game, and Assembly Hall was painted orange by the 16,618 fans wearing school colors. The pressure grew for Weber as the victory vaulted the Illini to the top spot in the polls the following week, a spot they would carry for the rest of the season. Regular season perfection and their 29–0 record ended on the last game of the regular season, however, as Illinois lost a 12-point, second half lead to Ohio State and lost on a last second shot to the Thad Matta-coached Buckeyes, 65–64. The Illini won the Big Ten regular season and Tournament titles.

In the 2005 NCAA tournament the team received the overall #1 seed, and top seed in the Midwest Regional. Illinois defeated Fairleigh Dickinson and Nevada in the first two rounds in Indianapolis. In the Sweet Sixteen, Weber led the Illini to a victory over his alma-mater, Milwaukee, then defeated Arizona in an amazing comeback to advance to the Final Four. After leading Illinois to a win over Louisville in the Final Four, Weber could not deliver the Fighting Illini their first national championship, falling 75–70 to North Carolina in the National Championship game.

Weber coached the team to the best record in school history, finishing 37–2, and tying the NCAA record for most wins in a season. Weber won many coaching awards after the season, including the Naismith Award and the Henry Iba Award.

2005–2012
Despite losing three starters to the NBA, the Illini finished the 2005–06 season with a 26–7 record and reached the second round of the NCAA tournament.

The 2006–07 season had a disappointing start, including the first three-game losing streak in Weber's tenure. However, the Illini rebounded to finish 23–11 and again qualify for the NCAA tournament.

The 2007–08 season marked the first time during Weber's tenure that the Illini did not qualify for a postseason tournament, finishing the season with an overall record of 16–19, 5–13 in the Big Ten.

The team improved markedly the following year, however, finishing 24–10, 11–7 in the Big Ten and returning to NCAA tournament.

After a 10–0 start to the 2011–12 season, Weber's Illini went 7–15, finishing the season with a 17–15 record.

On March 9, 2012, one day after the Illini lost its Big Ten tournament opening-round game to Iowa, Weber was relieved of his duties. During his nine-year tenure as Illinois coach, Weber amassed a Big Ten record of 89–64, and an overall record of 210–101. His overall win percentage with Illinois (67.5%) stands as second only to Bill Self in the modern era. His 210 wins are the third-most in school history, behind only Lou Henson and Harry Combes.

Kansas State University
On March 31, 2012, Weber was hired as head coach at Kansas State University, replacing Frank Martin, who had departed to become head coach at South Carolina. 

In his first season at K-State, Weber led the Wildcats to 27–8 record and tied for the Big 12 Conference title with a 14–4 conference mark. The title was K-State's first regular-season conference championship since 1977. Weber was named the 2013 Big 12 Conference Men's Basketball Coach of the Year. His first season at KSU ended with an upset loss in the second round of the NCAA tournament to LaSalle, 63–61, in Kansas City's Sprint Center. The team finished ranked #12 in the nation in the AP Poll and #20 in the Coaches Poll. Senior Rodney McGruder was named first-team all-conference.

Shortly after the end of Weber's first season, starting point guard Ángel Rodríguez and two other players announced their intentions to transfer. Kansas State's roster was further thinned when incoming freshman Neville Fincher was declared ineligible for the 2013–14 season, and incoming point guard Jevon Thomas was declared ineligible for the fall semester.

Weber started his second season at Kansas State 0–1, but finished the non-conference schedule with an 8-game winning streak and a 10–3 record. In its first conference game, Kansas State upset #6 Oklahoma State and earned a #25 ranking in the following week's AP Poll. The team finished the regular season with a 20–12 record, 10–8 in the Big 12, and returned to the NCAA tournament for a school-record fifth straight season.

The next two years for Kansas State under Weber were less successful. His third season at Kansas State ended with a 15–17 record (8–10 in Big 12 play), and the school did not advance to the NCAA Tournament for the first time since 2009. The losing record was only the second for Weber in his first 17 seasons as a head coach. Following the season, Weber's squad saw the transfer and departure of six scholarship players, including Marcus Foster, Jevon Thomas, Nigel Johnson, Tre Harris and Malek Harris. Following the departure of numerous players from the prior season, the 2015–16 season was again difficult. The Wildcats finished 17–15, 5–13 in Big 12 play.

From that point, Weber successfully rebuilt the program. In 2016–17, the Wildcats returned to the NCAA tournament and finished with a 21–14 (8–10) record. In 2017–18, the team improved to 25–12 (10–8) and advanced to the Elite Eight of the 2018 NCAA tournament, including a 61–58 win over Kentucky in the Sweet Sixteen. The team received a #19 national ranking at season's end in the Coaches Poll.

In 2018–19, the team tied with Texas Tech for its second regular-season Big 12 Conference title under Weber, with a 14–4 conference record. For the third consecutive season, Kansas State was invited to the NCAA tournament. After an upset first-round loss in the NCAA tournament, the team finished with a 25–9 record and a #18 national ranking in the AP Poll, and #19 ranking in the Coaches Poll. Two players from the team were named first-team all-conference: Dean Wade and Barry Brown Jr.

Weber's final three teams saw little success, posting records of 11-21 in 2020, 9-20 in 2021, and 14-17 in 2022, and finishing 9th or 10th in the Big 12 all three years.  
The day after a loss to West Virginia in the preliminary round of the Big 12 tournament, Weber announced his resignation from Kansas State. 

Weber's tenure with Kansas State concluded with two conference co-championships and five NCAA Tournament appearances, including an appearance in the 2018 Elite Eight. He ranks third on K-State's all-time total wins list, behind only Jack Hartman and Tex Winter, and 11th in overall winning percentage.

National team
In the summer of 2019, Weber coached the United States national under-19 team at the 2019 FIBA Under-19 World Cup in Heraklion, Greece. His team won the tournament championship with a 7–0 record.

Head coaching record

Personal
Weber was born in Milwaukee to Louis and Dawn Weber, growing up with two sisters and two brothers.  Weber attended the University of Wisconsin–Milwaukee, and played college baseball for the Milwaukee Panthers. He graduated from UWM in 1978 with a bachelor's degree in education. Weber added a master's degree in education administration and physical education from Western Kentucky University in 1981. He is married to Megan Weber, and has three daughters – Christy, Emily, and Hannah.

See also
 List of NCAA Division I Men's Final Four appearances by coach

References

1956 births
Living people
American men's basketball coaches
Basketball coaches from Wisconsin
Basketball players from Milwaukee
College men's basketball head coaches in the United States
Illinois Fighting Illini men's basketball coaches
Kansas State Wildcats men's basketball coaches
Milwaukee Panthers baseball players
Purdue Boilermakers men's basketball coaches
Southern Illinois Salukis men's basketball coaches
Sportspeople from Milwaukee
University of Wisconsin–Milwaukee alumni
Western Kentucky Hilltoppers basketball coaches